Serafino Macchiati (Camerino, Italy, January 17, 1861 – Paris, France, December 12, 1916)  was an Italian painter.

Biography
He first studied at the Accademia Clementina of Bologna, and in 1880 moved to Rome, where he was an illustrator for the journal “La Tribuna illustrata”. In 1898, the editor Lemerre invited him to Paris to illustrate the Romance series of Paul Bourget and other periodicals. Vittore Grubicy, and also Giacomo Balla hosted him at Fontenay in 1900, where he painted divisionist impressions of Paris and its surroundings. He had an individual exhibition at the 1922 Venice Biennale.

Macchiati was knighted into the Order of the Crown of Italy. He illustrated for an edition of Dante's Divine comedy, and also painted two canvases on Spiritualist experiences, Le visionnaire and Scena spiritica.

References

1861 births
1916 deaths
19th-century Italian painters
Italian male painters
20th-century Italian painters
Painters from Bologna
Divisionist painters
Brera Academy alumni
19th-century Italian male artists
20th-century Italian male artists